Below is a list of major party United States presidential candidates who lost their birth or resident states. While many successful candidates have won the presidency without winning their birth state, only four (James K. Polk, Woodrow Wilson, Richard Nixon and Donald Trump) have won election despite losing their state of residence. Nixon, a lifelong Californian, had taken residence in New York after his failed run for governor of California, but later switched back during his presidency and ahead of his reelection.

Candidates who won the election

Candidates who lost the election 
Only candidates who won at least one state (not necessarily their birth or resident state) in the general election are listed here.

Candidates who lost the home states of their running mates

 In 1796, John Adams lost South Carolina, the home state of his running mate Thomas Pinckney. Thomas Jefferson lost New York, the home state of his running mate Aaron Burr as well as Burr's birth state of New Jersey.
 In 1800, Thomas Jefferson lost New Jersey, the birth state of his running mate Aaron Burr. John Adams lost South Carolina, the home state of his running mate Charles Cotesworth Pinckney.
 In 1804, Charles Cotesworth Pinckney lost New York, the home state of his running mate Rufus King, as well as King's birth state of Massachusetts.
 In 1808, Charles Cotesworth Pinckney lost New York, the home state of his running mate Rufus King.
 In 1812, James Madison lost Massachusetts, the home state of his running mate Elbridge Gerry. DeWitt Clinton lost Pennsylvania, the home state of his running mate Jared Ingersoll.
 In 1816, Rufus King lost Maryland, the home state of his running mate John Eager Howard.
 In 1824, John Quincy Adams lost South Carolina, the home state of his running mate John C. Calhoun. Henry Clay lost New York, the home state of his running mate Nathan Sanford. William H. Crawford lost North Carolina, the home state of his running mate Nathaniel Macon.
 In 1828, John Quincy Adams lost Pennsylvania, the home state of his running mate Richard Rush.
 In 1832, Henry Clay lost Pennsylvania, the home state of his running mate John Sergeant. William Wirt lost Pennsylvania, the home state of his running mate Amos Ellmaker. John Floyd lost Massachusetts, the home state of his running mate Henry Lee.
 In 1836, Martin Van Buren lost Kentucky, the home state of his running mate Richard Mentor Johnson. William Henry Harrison and Daniel Webster both lost New York, the home state of their mutual running mate Francis Granger, as well as Granger's birth state of Connecticut. Hugh Lawson White and Willie Person Mangum both lost Virginia, the home state of their mutual running mate John Tyler. 
 In 1840, William Henry Harrison lost Virginia, the home state of his running mate John Tyler. 
 In 1844, Henry Clay lost New York, the home state of his running mate Theodore Frelinghuysen.
 In 1848, Lewis Cass lost Kentucky, the home state of his running mate William Orlando Butler.
 In 1852, Winfield Scott lost North Carolina, the home state of his running mate William Alexander Graham.
 In 1856, John C. Frémont lost New Jersey, the home state of his running mate William L. Dayton. Millard Fillmore lost Tennessee, the home state of his running mate Andrew Jackson Donelson.
 In 1860, Stephen A. Douglas lost Georgia, the home state of his running mate Herschel Vespasian Johnson. John C. Breckinridge lost Oregon, the home state of his running mate Joseph Lane. John Bell lost Massachusetts, the home state of his running mate Edward Everett.
 In 1864, George B. McClellan lost Ohio, the home state of his running mate George H. Pendleton. In addition, due to the American Civil War, Abraham Lincoln did not receive any votes in North Carolina, the birth state of his running mate Andrew Johnson.
 In 1868, Ulysses S. Grant lost New York, the birth state of his running mate Schuyler Colfax. Horatio Seymour lost Missouri, the home state of his running mate Francis Preston Blair Jr.
 In 1876, Rutherford B. Hayes lost New York, the home state of his running mate William A. Wheeler. Samuel J. Tilden lost Ohio, the birth state of his running mate Thomas A. Hendricks.
 In 1880, Winfield Scott Hancock lost Indiana, the home state of his running mate William Hayden English.
 In 1884, Grover Cleveland lost Ohio, the birth state of his running mate Thomas A. Hendricks.
 In 1888, Grover Cleveland lost Ohio, the home state of his running mate Allen G. Thurman.
 In 1892, Benjamin Harrison lost New York, the home state of his running mate Whitelaw Reid. James B. Weaver lost Virginia, the home state of his running mate James G. Field.
 In 1896, William Jennings Bryan lost Maine, the home state of his running mate Arthur Sewall.
 In 1900, William Jennings Bryan lost Illinois, the home state of his running mate Adlai Stevenson I.
 In 1904, Alton B. Parker lost West Virginia, the home state of his running mate Henry Gassaway Davis, as well as Davis' birth state of Maryland.
 In 1908, William Jennings Bryan lost Indiana, the home state of his running mate John W. Kern.
 In 1912, William Howard Taft lost New York, the home state of his running mate Nicholas Murray Butler.
 In 1916, Woodrow Wilson lost Indiana, the home state of his running mate Thomas R. Marshall. Charles Evans Hughes lost Ohio, the birth state of his running mate Charles W. Fairbanks.
 In 1920, James M. Cox lost New York, the home state of his running mate Franklin D. Roosevelt.
 In 1924, John W. Davis lost Nebraska, the home state of his running mate Charles W. Bryan, as well as Bryan's birth state of Illinois. Robert M. La Follette lost Montana, the home state of his running mate Burton K. Wheeler, as well as Wheeler's birth state of Massachusetts.
 In 1932, Herbert Hoover lost Kansas, the home state of his running mate Charles Curtis.
 In 1936, Alf Landon lost Illinois, the home state of his running mate Frank Knox, as well as Knox's birth state of Massachusetts.
 In 1940, Franklin D. Roosevelt lost Iowa, the home state of his running mate Henry A. Wallace. Wendell Willkie lost Oregon, the home state of his running mate Charles L. McNary.
 In 1956, Adlai Stevenson II lost Tennessee, the home state of his running mate Estes Kefauver.
 In 1960, Richard Nixon lost Massachusetts, the home state of his running mate Henry Cabot Lodge Jr.
 In 1964, Barry Goldwater lost New York, the home state of his running mate William E. Miller.
 In 1968, Richard Nixon lost Maryland, the home state of his running mate Spiro Agnew. George Wallace lost California, the home state of his running mate Curtis LeMay, as well as LeMay's birth state of Ohio.
 In 1972, George McGovern lost Maryland, the home state of his running mate Sargent Shriver.
 In 1984, Walter Mondale lost New York, the home state of his running mate Geraldine Ferraro.
 In 1988, Michael Dukakis lost Texas, the home state of his running mate Lloyd Bentsen.
 In 1996, Bob Dole lost New York, the home state of his running mate Jack Kemp, as well as Kemp's birth state of California.
 In 2004, John Kerry lost North Carolina, the home state of his running mate John Edwards,  as well as Edwards' birth state of South Carolina.
 In 2012, Mitt Romney lost Wisconsin, the home state of his running mate Paul Ryan.

See also
 President of the United States

State